Ananthagiri is a village in Rajavommangi Mandal, Alluri Sitharama Raju district in the state of Andhra Pradesh in India.

Geography 

Demographics 
 India census, Ananthagiri had a population of 431, out of which 216 were male and 215 were female. The population of children below 6 years of age was 11%. The literacy rate of the village was 58%.

References 

Villages in Rajavommangi mandal